Hans Herlin (1925–December 20, 1994) was a German novelist. Born in Stadtlohn, North Rhine-Westphalia (Germany), he was drafted into the Luftwaffe in World War II and trained as a pilot. In 1944 he fled to Switzerland and lived in France from 1972. He started a writing career as a journalist and worked his way up to become managing editor of Molden, one of Germany's largest publishing houses. In 1961 he wrote a detailed account of the St Louis voyage with 900+ Jewish refugees from Hamburg to Cuba and on to Antwerp, called "Kein gelobtes Land". In 1972 he began writing books full time, and in 1975 published his best known novel Commemorations, about "Nazi skeletons in the national closet". Commemorations was published in the United States in 1975 by St. Martin's Press. His books have been published in more than 18 countries.

Herlin died of a heart attack at age 68, at his home in Autun,Burgundy on December 20, 1994.

List of Novels
Der Teufelsflieger. Ernst Udet und die Geschichte seiner Zeit (1974)
Freunde. Roman  (1974)
Commemorations (1975)
Tag- und Nachtgeschichten (1978)
Which Way the Wind  (1978)
Der letzte Mann von der Doggerbank. Tatsachenbericht (1979)
Die geheimen Mächte des Übersinnlichen. Unglaubliche Tatsachen (1980)
Die Geliebte. Die tragische Liebe der Clara Petacci zu Benito Mussolini (1980)
Satan ist auf Gottes Seite. Roman  (1981)
Verdammter Atlantik. Schicksale Deutscher U-Boot-Fahrer. Tatsachenbericht (1981)
Der letzte Frühling in Paris (1983)
Solo Run (1983)
Achtung Welt, Hier ist Kreuzweg! Die Flieger von Hiroshima (1984)
Grishin by J. Maxwell Brownjohn, Hans Herlin (1987)
The Last Spring in Paris (1988)
Siberian Transfer (1992)
The Survivor. The True Story of the Sinking of the Doggerbank by John Brownjohn, Hans Herlin (1995)
Die Sturmflut. Nordseeküste und Hamburg im Februar 1962 (2005)

References

1925 births
1994 deaths
People from Borken (district)
People from the Province of Westphalia
Writers from North Rhine-Westphalia
Luftwaffe personnel of World War II
20th-century German novelists
German male novelists
20th-century German male writers